Seafarers' Hours of Work and the Manning of Ships Convention, 1996 is  an International Labour Organization Convention.

It was established in 1996, with the preamble stating:
Recalling the entry into force of the United Nations Convention on the Law of the Sea, 1982, on 16 November 1994, and

Having decided upon the adoption of certain proposals with regard to the revision of the Wages, Hours of Work and Manning (Sea) Convention (Revised), 1958, and the Wages, Hours of Work and Manning (Sea) Recommendation, 1958,...

Seafarers' Hours of Work and the Manning of Ships Convention and COVID-19 
Following the outbreak of COVID-19, the International Labor Organization (ILO), in conjunction with the Seafarers' Hours of Work and the Manning of Ships Convention, called on governments to take all possible measures to protect seafarers and to take steps to reduce the risk of COVID-19 virus infection. The ILO Memorandum was intended to coordinate the vision of the International Maritime Organization (IMO) and the World Health Organization (WHO) to prevent the spread of COVID-19.
A joint statement issued by the International Civil Aviation Organization (ICAO), the International Maritime Organization (IMO) and the International Labor Organization (ILO) on May 22, 2020 emphasized the call for key worker status for seafarers. It relieves crews of travel restrictions and make it easier for them to join or leave the ships.

Ratifications
As of 2022, the convention had been ratified by 21 states. However, all have subsequently denounced it.

References

External links 
Text.
Ratifications.

International Labour Organization conventions
Working time
Treaties concluded in 1996
Treaties entered into force in 2002
Treaties of Belgium
Treaties of Germany
Treaties of Ireland
Treaties of Romania
Treaties of Seychelles
Treaties of Slovenia
Treaties of the United Kingdom
Treaties extended to the Isle of Man
Admiralty law treaties
1996 in labor relations